Edward Richards was an early settler of and nine term selectman in Dedham, Massachusetts.

Richards was born circa 1610 -1615. He may have been the brother of Nathaniel Richards and, through his wife Susan, was brother-in-law of John Hunting. He may have traveled in 1632 on board the Lyon from England to Massachusetts with Nathaniel and settled in Cambridge, Massachusetts until 1636. Nathaniel moved to Connecticut to found Hartford, but Edward Richards first appears in Dedham in 1636, which is where he married Susan in 1638. He signed the Dedham Covenant and was a member of First Church and Parish in Dedham.

Though Dedham was intended to be a Utopian commune, and there was little disparity in wealth, Richards went by the title of "Gent" and, unlike others, aspired to a manor. He received large tracts of land, second only to the minister, John Allin. Before moving to Dedham, he purchased a large estate to use as his home and did not receive a house lot, as other settlers did. He then purchased and was distributed other tracts of land, one of which became known as Broad Oak.

He died in May 1684. In his will, he left his home to his second son, Nathaniel, and not his oldest, John. It is suspected that this was because Nathaniel had given Richards more grandsons and thus would be in a better position to transmit the family name down through successively more prosperous generations.

Notes

References

Works cited

Dedham, Massachusetts selectmen
People from Cambridge, Massachusetts
Kingdom of England emigrants to Massachusetts Bay Colony
1684 deaths
Signers of the Dedham Covenant
People from colonial Dedham, Massachusetts